Salih Uyar is a citizen of Turkey who was held in extrajudicial detention in the United States Guantanamo Bay detention camp, in Cuba.  Salih Uyar was repatriated on April 18, 2005.

Casio watch

When the Department of Defense was forced to comply with US District Court Justice Jed Rakoff's court order to release the documents from the Guantanamo detainees's Combatant Status Review Tribunals Uyar's name came to light.'

One of the reasons he was detained was that he was captured wearing a Casio F91W digital watch.

Uyar asked his Tribunal: "If it's a crime to carry this watch, your own military personnel also carry this watch, too, Does that mean that they're just terrorists as well?"

On March 3, 2006, in response to a court order from Jed Rakoff the Department of Defense published a summarized transcript from his Combatant Status Review Tribunal.

Press reports
On July 12, 2006 the magazine Mother Jones provided excerpts from the transcripts of a selection of the Guantanamo detainees.
The article informed readers:

More than a dozen detainees were cited for owning cheap digital watches, particularly "the infamous Casio watch of the type used by Al Qaeda members for bomb detonators."

The article quoted Uyar, and three other watch owners:

If it is a crime to carry this watch, your own military personnel also carry this watch. Does this mean they're just terrorists as well?

Determined not to have been an Enemy Combatant

According to The Washington Post'' Uyar was one of the detainees who was determined not to have been an "enemy combatant" after all.
They report that Uyar has been released.

References

External links
 The Guantánamo Files: Website Extras (6) – Escape to Pakistan (Uyghurs and others) Andy Worthington

Living people
Guantanamo detainees known to have been released
Turkish extrajudicial prisoners of the United States
1962 births